Slovakia participated in the Eurovision Song Contest 1998 in Birmingham, United Kingdom with the song "Modlitba" written by Gabriel Dušík and Anna Wepperyová. The song was performed by Katarína Hasprová. The Slovak entry for the 1998 contest was selected through the music competition Bratislavská lýra, organised by the Slovak broadcaster STV. The competition was held on 7 June 1997 where Katarína Hasprová eventually emerged as the winner. The song Hasprová performed at the Eurovision Song Contest, "Modlitba", was internally selected and was released on 9 March.

Background

Slovakia missed the 1993 contest when its selected song "Amnestia na neveru" by band Elán failed to qualify for the contest due to the fact that entry scored an insufficient number of points in a special qualifying round entitled "Kvalifikacija za Millstreet". To this point, the country's best placing was 18th, which it achieved in 1996 with the song "Kym nas mas" performed by Marcel Palonder. Slovakia's least successful result was in  when it placed 19th with the song "Nekonecna piesen" by Martin Durinda and Tublatanka.

The Slovak national broadcaster, Slovenská Televízia (STV), broadcasts the event within Slovakia and organises the selection process for the nation's entry. Since its debut at the contest, Slovakia has used internal selections to select the Slovak entry in the past. However, in 1998, the broadcaster has opted to stage a national final for the first time in its competitive history in order to select artist that would represent Slovakia.

Before Eurovision

Bratislavská lýra '97 

Bratislavská lýra '97 was the national final format developed by Slovenská Televízia (STV) in order to select artist who will represent Slovakia at the Eurovision Song Contest 1998. All competing songs were accompanied by orchestra, conducted by Vlado Valovic. 14 songs competed during the show and Katarina Hasprova was selected as the winner by an 10-member expert jury panel. In addition to winning the right to represent Slovakia at the Eurovision Song Contest 1998, the winning artist was also awarded monetary prize of 5 thousand dollars. In addition to the performances of the competing entries, Berco Balogh and Lucie Bila Boom Band performed as guests.

Song selection 
On 9 March 1998, STV announced that Katarina Hasprova would perform the song "Modlitba" at the Eurovision Song Contest 1998. "Modlitba" was written by Gabriel Dušík and Anna Wepperyová.

At Eurovision 

The Eurovision Song Contest 1998 took place at the National Indoor Arena in Birmingham, UK, on 9 May 1998. According to the Eurovision rules, the twenty-five participants were made up of the previous year's winning country and host nation UK, the eighteen countries which had the highest average points total over the preceding five contests, and any eligible countries which did not compete in the 1997 contest. Slovakia was one of the eligible countries which did not compete in the 1997 contest, and thus were permitted to participate. The running order for the contest was decided by a draw held on 13 November 1997. Slovakia was assigned to perform 6th at the 1998 Contest, following Switzerland and preceding Poland.

Heading into the final of the contest, BBC reported that bookmakers ranked the entry joint 17th out of the 25 entries. The Slovak performance featured Hasprova on stage wearing a black dress, joined by one drummer and three guitarists in black outfits. After the voting concluded, Slovakia scored 8 points, all from Croatia, and placed 21st in a field of 25. At the time this result was the Slovakia's worst placing in its competitive history, and was the nation's first finish outside of top 20. The Slovak conductor at the contest was Vladimir Valovic.

Voting 
The same voting system in use since 1975 was again implemented for 1998 contest, with each country providing 1–8, 10 and 12 points to the ten highest-ranking songs as determined by a selected jury or the viewing public through televoting, with countries not allowed to vote for themselves. Slovakia opted to use public televoting to determine which countries would receive their points. The Slovak spokesperson, who announced the points awarded by the Slovak public during the final, was Alena Heribanova.

After Eurovision
Due to a poor average score, Slovakia was excluded from the Eurovision Song Contest 1999 and was therefore not eligible to participate until 2000. However, after being due to return in 2000, STV withdrew due to financial concerns. Slovakia ultimately returned to the contest 11 years later, in 2009.

See also
Slovakia in the Eurovision Song Contest
Eurovision Song Contest 1998

References

Bibliography 
 

1998
Countries in the Eurovision Song Contest 1998